Apollon Makrychori Football Club is a Greek football club based in Makrychori, Karditsa (regional unit), Greece.

Honours

Domestic

 Karditsa FCA champion: 2
 2017–18, 2019–20

References

Football clubs in Thessaly
Karditsa (regional unit)
Association football clubs established in 1972
1972 establishments in Greece
Gamma Ethniki clubs